Francis Flores (born August 12, 1985) is an American professional wrestler best known for his time with Impact Wrestling, where he performed under the ring name Fallah Bahh. He began his wrestling career on New Jersey's independent circuit, wrestling for both the Independent Wrestling Federation and Monster Factory Pro Wrestling. He began wrestling for Impact Wrestling in 2017, competing for the Impact Grand Championship. He later formed a tag team with KM.

Professional wrestling career

Independent circuit (2005–2017)
Flores began his wrestling career in 2005, wrestling under the name Franciz for Independent Wrestling Federation in New Jersey. While in IWF, Flores would become a three time tag team champion as well one time IWF American Champion, defeating Kareem West for the title and a two time IWF Heavyweight Champion.

In 2011, Flores wrestled under the names Fala / Fallah, before fully transitioning to using Fallah Bahh. In 2016, Bahh began teaming with Mario Bokara and Bobby Wayward under the tag team name The Money and the Miles for New Jersey's Monster Factory Pro Wrestling, winning the MFPW Tag Team Championship with Bokara on October 15, 2016.

Impact Wrestling (2017–2022)

On the March 3, 2017, taping of Impact!, Fallah Bahh made his Impact Wrestling debut in a six-man tag match. He teamed up with Idris Abraham and Mario Bokara against Laredo Kid, Garza Jr., and Mahabali Shera in a losing effort. It was revealed on April 2, 2017 that Bahh had signed a deal with the company. On the November 16 episode of Impact! Bahh competed in an Impact Grand Championship match against champion Ethan Carter III. Bahh won the first round, but lost in the third round via pinfall.  On the Thanksgiving episode of Impact! Bahh took part in the annual Turkey Bowl match, renamed "Eli Drake’s Gravy Train Turkey Trot" for the night alongside Allie, Garza Jr., Richard Justice and Eddie Edwards taking on the team of KM, Laurel Van Ness, El Hijo del Fantasma, Chris Adonis and Caleb Konley, with Bahh's team picking up the win.

Bahh once again competed for the Impact Grand Championship on the January 4, 2018 episode of Impact!, facing off against champion Ethan Carter III and Matt Sydal in a three-way in a losing effort. On September 13 episode of Impact!, Austin Aries granted Bahh a match for the Impact World Championship. Bahh faced Aries in the main event of that episode, but was not able to win the title as he lost to Aries. Bahh formed a tag team in Impact with KM. on the October 11 episode of Impact, Bahh, Eddie Edwards and Johnny Impact lost to Austin Aries, Moose and Killer Kross. On the February 1 episode of Impact, Bahh lost to Psycho Clown. On the February 15 episode of Impact, Team IMPACT (Bahh, Eddie Edwards, Eli Drake and Sami Callihan) lost to Team AAA (Psycho Clown, Vikingo, Aerostar and Puma King). On the March 1 episode of Impact, Bahh and KM defeated Reno Scum. In September 2019, he forged an alliance with TJP, and they began feuding with Michael Elgin.

In October 2021, Bahh entered a tournament to determine the inaugural Impact Digital Media Champion, where he defeated Sam Beale in the first round but lost to Jordynne Grace in the final at Bound for Glory. In January 2022, his profile was removed from Impact's official website, signaling the end of his run with the company.

Championships and accomplishments
Chaotic Wrestling
CW Tag Team Championship (2 times) – with Kongo
Impact Wrestling
Gravy Train Turkey Trot (2017) – with Eddie Edwards, Allie, Richard Justice, and Garza Jr.
Gravy Train Turkey Trot (2018) – with KM, Alisha Edwards, Kikutaro and Dezmond Xavier
Independent Wrestling Federation
IWF Heavyweight Championship (2 times)
IWF American Championship (1 time)
IWF Tag Team Championship (3 times) – with Travis Blake (1), Chris Steeler (1), and Dan McGuire (1)
Monster Factory Pro Wrestling
MFPW Tag Team Championship (2 times) – with Bobby Wayward (1) and Mario Bokara (1)
MF Cup Tournament (2017) – with Mario Bokara
NWA Liberty City/NWA On Fire
On Fire Tag Team Championship (2 times) – with Makua
Pro Wrestling Illustrated
Ranked 370 of the top 500 singles wrestlers in the PWI 500 in 2009
Pro Wrestling Syndicate
PWS Heavyweight Championship (1 time)
PWS Tag Team Championship (1 time) – with DJ Phat Pat
Reality of Wrestling
ROW Heavyweight Championship (1 time)
River City Wrestling
RCW Championship (1 time)
Warriors of Wrestling
WOW Tag Team Championship (1 time) – with Harley
WrestlePro
WrestlePro Tag Team Championship (1 time) – with KM
WrestlePro Silver Championship (1 time, current)
WrestlePro Alaska Last Frontier Championship (1 time, current)

References

External links 
 Fallah Bahh's Impact Wrestling profile

1985 births
American professional wrestlers of Filipino descent
Living people
People from Bloomfield, New Jersey
Filipino male professional wrestlers
21st-century professional wrestlers